Amoroso, released in 1977, is an album that uses an orchestral arrangement to produce the Brazilian sound of bossa nova. The album features João Gilberto on vocals and guitar, backed by a large, but not overpowering, arrangement.

Track listing 
 "'S Wonderful"
 "Estate"
 "Tin Tin Por Tin Tin"
 "Besame Mucho"
 "Wave"
 "Caminhos Cruzados"
 "Triste"
 "Zingaro"
The latter four songs were written and composed by fellow bossa nova legend Antônio Carlos Jobim and adapted by Gilberto. The string section was arranged by Claus Ogerman.

CD Rerelease with "Brasil" 
The compact disc re-release of the album is paired on a single disc with the 1981 album Brasil, with the Amoroso cover and the tiles of both albums.

Personnel
João Gilberto - guitar, vocals
Milcho Leviev - synthesizer
Bud Shank - flute
Grady Tate - drums
Ralph Grierson - keyboards
Marilyn Baker - viola
Israel Baker - violin
Israel Baker - concertmaster
Michael Boddicker - synthesizer
Stella Castellucci
Claus Ogerman - arranger, conductor
Joe Correro - drums
Paulinho Da Costa - percussion
Isabelle Daskoff - violin
Bonnie Douglas - violin
Glenn Garrett - flute
Anne Goodman - cello
Don Henderson - assistant engineer
Lee Herschberg - digital mastering
Jim Hughart - bass
Helen Keane - producer
Tommy LiPuma - producer
Johnny Mandel - arranger, conductor
Joel Moss - engineer
Nelson Motta - liner notes
Matt Pierson - reissue producer
Nathan Ross - violin
Julie Sayres - coordination
Al Schmitt - engineer, mixing
David Schwartz - viola
Paul Shure - violin
Gerald Vinci - violin, concertmaster
Helain Wittenberg - viola
John Wittenberg - violin
Noel Newbolt - production assistant
Joe Goodman - violin
Bobby Dubow - violin
Claire Fisher - keyboards
Michael Diehl - design
Guto Graca Mello - executive producer
Bob Lipsett - violin
Geoffrey Holder - paintings
Eric Bowman - assistant engineer
Harry Bluestone - violin
Célio Martins - engineer
André Midani - executive producer
Eddie Cain - flute
Eduardo Ramalho - assistant engineer

References

Answers.com. 

1977 albums
João Gilberto albums
Albums arranged by Claus Ogerman
Warner Records albums
Albums produced by Tommy LiPuma